Christopher W. Lentz is a brigadier general in the United States Air Force.

Career
Lentz was commissioned in 1983 and graduated from Wayne State University the following year. In 1985, he attended the School of Aerospace Medicine at Brooks Air Force Base and later held two clerkships at Wilford Hall Medical Center. Lentz received his Doctorate of Medicine from the Wayne State University School of Medicine in 1988. He later became a Fellow at the University of Texas Medical Branch and the UNC School of Medicine and a Resident at the Medical College of Wisconsin.

From 1996 to 1999, Lentz was assigned to the 59th Medical Wing at Wilford Hall Medical Center. He was later stationed at the Headquarters of Air Mobility Command from 2003 to 2008. Lentz was a Critical Care Air Transport Team director at Ramstein Air Base from 2010 to 2011 before being assigned to The Pentagon in 2012. He returned to Air Mobility Command the following year. In 2016, Lentze was assigned to the Air Force Headquarters.

Awards he has received include the Meritorious Service Medal with four oak leaf clusters, the Air Force Commendation Medal, the Air Force Achievement Medal, the National Defense Service Medal, the Global War on Terrorism Service Medal, the Air Force Expeditionary Service Ribbon with oak leaf cluster, the Air Force Longevity Service Award with three oak leaf clusters, the Armed Forces Reserve Medal with silver hourglass device and 'M' device, the Air Force Training Ribbon with oak leaf cluster, the Air Force Outstanding Unit Award with two oak leaf clusters and the Air Force Organizational Excellence Award with three oak leaf clusters.

Education
Wayne State University
School of Aerospace Medicine
Wayne State University School of Medicine 
University of Texas Medical Branch
Medical College of Wisconsin
UNC School of Medicine
Air War College
University of Cincinnati
National War College
Uniformed Services University of the Health Sciences
Capstone Military Leadership Program

References

United States Air Force generals
United States Air Force Medical Corps officers
Wayne State University alumni
Wayne State University School of Medicine alumni
University of Texas Medical Branch alumni
Medical College of Wisconsin alumni
University of North Carolina School of Medicine alumni
University of Cincinnati alumni
Air War College alumni
National War College alumni
Uniformed Services University of the Health Sciences alumni
National Defense University alumni
Living people
Year of birth missing (living people)
Place of birth missing (living people)